Paleontological Journal is a monthly peer-reviewed Russian journal of paleontology established in 1959. It focuses on the paleontology and the fossil records of Eastern Europe and Asia. Articles are published simultaneously in Russian and English.

The journal is edited by Alexei Yu. Rozanov and published by MAIK Nauka/Interperiodica.

Editors-in-Chief

Acad. Yuri A. Orlov (1959–1966) 
Dr. Vasily E. Ruzhentsev (1967–1978) 
Acad. Leonid P. Tatarinov (1978–1988, 1994–2001) 
Dr. Igor S. Barskov (1988–1993) 
Acad. Alexei Yu. Rozanov (since 2001)

Abstracting and indexing
Paleonotological Journal is indexed and abstracted in:

According to the Journal Citation Reports, the journal has a 2011 impact factor of 0.454.

See also
 Palaeoworld

References

External links 
 

Paleontology journals
Nauka academic journals
Multilingual journals
Publications established in 1967
Monthly journals
Springer Science+Business Media academic journals
Russian Academy of Sciences academic journals